Natalia Parhomenko (née Vysotska; born 21 March 1979) is a Ukrainian handballer playing for HC Kuban Krasnodar and the Ukrainian national team.

References

Sportspeople from Kryvyi Rih
1979 births
Living people
Ukrainian female handball players
Expatriate handball players
Ukrainian expatriate sportspeople in Romania
Ukrainian expatriate sportspeople in Russia